Tropical Storm Fay was a strong and unusual tropical storm that moved erratically across the state of Florida and the Caribbean Sea. The sixth named storm of the 2008 Atlantic hurricane season, Fay formed from a vigorous tropical wave on August 15 over the Dominican Republic. It passed over the island of Hispaniola, into the Gulf of Gonâve, across the island of Cuba, and made landfall on the Florida Keys late in the afternoon of August 18 before veering into the Gulf of Mexico. It again made landfall near Naples, Florida, in the early hours of August 19 and progressed northeast through the Florida peninsula, emerging into the Atlantic Ocean near Melbourne on August 20. Extensive flooding took place in parts of Florida as a result of its slow movement. On August 21, it made landfall again near New Smyrna Beach, Florida, moving due west across the Panhandle, crossing Gainesville and Panama City, Florida. As it zigzagged from water to land, it became the first storm in recorded history to make landfall in Florida four times. Thirty-six deaths were blamed on Fay. The storm also resulted in one of the most prolific tropical cyclone related tornado outbreaks on record. A total of 81 tornadoes touched down across five states, three of which were rated as EF2. Damage from Fay was heavy, estimated at $560 million.

Meteorological history

A tropical wave moved off the coast of Africa on August 7 without any significant convection, with an associated low pressure area moving southwestward away from the coast. It passed just south of the Cape Verde Islands, and tracked generally westward with a subtropical ridge centered to its north over the Azores. Late on August 9, an area of convection developed in association with the wave. With generally favorable conditions for development, the system began slowly organizing, to the extent that on August 10, the National Hurricane Center (NHC) remarked for its potential to become a tropical depression in a few days. By August 11, however, the thunderstorm activity became disorganized and limited, though the next day convection reformed by the time it was located about 650 mi (1050 km) east of the Lesser Antilles. The hurricane hunters first flew into the system on August 12, though the flight only reported a broad area of low pressure.

After the hurricane hunters' flight, the system became disorganized as environmental conditions became less favorable, and by late on August 13 the convection was limited and well-removed from the low center. The next day, thunderstorm activity increased and organized, though another hurricane hunters flight confirmed the system did not develop into a tropical cyclone. After passing over the northern Lesser Antilles, the system moved over the Virgin Islands and Puerto Rico, maintaining an area of deep convection. It became better defined as it moved through the Mona Passage, and a hurricane hunters flight confirmed the presence of a closed circulation. Initially, it was forecast to steadily intensify before and after crossing Cuba, later reaching minimal hurricane status in the eastern Gulf of Mexico; the HWRF hurricane model predicted for Fay to become a strong hurricane off the coast of western Florida.

Upon first becoming a tropical cyclone, Tropical Storm Fay was moving steadily westward over Hispaniola, influenced by a ridge to its north. At around 1200 UTC on August 16, the storm emerged into the Gulf of Gonâve, with little organized convection near the center. Environmental conditions favored strengthening, and convection quickly developed over the center. By early on August 17, a hurricane hunters flight reported a better organized circulation center, and satellite images displayed well-established outflow within a large convection envelope. After passing near or over southwestern Granma Province in Cuba, upper-level wind shear increased slightly, and the convection diminished near the center. The storm turned more to the northwest, due to a trough weakening the ridge to its north.  However, at this time, the ECMWF forecast had Fay making landfall in Southwest Florida, crossing into the Atlantic, then tracking westward across the Florida Panhandlewhich is exactly what it would end up doing.

Fay made four Florida landfalls, first at Key West in the late afternoon of August 18, then early the following morning at Cape Romano south of Naples as a 65 mph (100 km/h) tropical storm. Later that day, while crossing central Florida, Fay unexpectedly strengthened over land to just under hurricane intensity with 70 mph (110 km/h) winds and a pressure of 986 mbar, which is a stronger intensity than Fay had ever obtained over open ocean. According to some local meteorologists, Fay actually gained strength over Florida's inland waters, including the vast expanses of the Florida Everglades and Lake Okeechobee The storm developed an eye feature, and continued to hold its strength for the rest of the day. After many hours of land interaction, Fay began to weaken. Fay regained some strength, however, after leaving land at Melbourne and heading northward over the warm Atlantic Ocean waters, only to be deflected westward as it encountered a high pressure ridge. This resulted in another landfall at Flagler Beach in the afternoon of August 21.  Fay then emerged into the northeastern Gulf of Mexico and made its fourth landfall on the morning of August 23 near Carrabelle in the Florida Panhandle.  Fay narrowly missed making yet another landfall, the center staying barely onshore while passing Panama City and St. Andrews Bay. Fay then weakened to a depression later that day. For the next several days, Fay was a slow moving tropical depression. Fay started moving to the northeast over southern Mississippi, where it moved over Alabama and finally dissipated on August 27 over Georgia.

Preparations

When advisories were first issued on Tropical Storm Fay late on August 15, tropical storm warnings were issued across the entire northern coast of the Hispaniola and Eastern Cuba as well as Southeastern Bahamas with tropical storm watches issued in parts of Northeastern Cuba and the Central Bahamas. The storm tracked far enough south for the Bahamas watches and warnings to be cancelled, but additional tropical storm warnings were issued for all of the coast Haiti. Additional tropical storm watches and warnings were issued in Jamaica, the Cayman Islands, Florida, Georgia (U.S. state), Alabama, Mississippi, and Louisiana. With Fay repeatedly being forecasted to become a hurricane, hurricane watches were issued in parts of Central Cuba as well as Southwestern Florida. A hurricane warning was issued for Southwestern Florida on August 18. Fay's unexpected strengthening over land prompted a hurricane watch to briefly be issued for Northeastern Florida and Southeastern Georgia on August 19.

Impact

Caribbean

On August 15, the weather disturbance that would become Fay made landfall on Hispaniola. The system developed into a tropical storm while producing heavy rains on the island, prompting a major flash flood threat. The storm caused minor damage in Dominican Republic including falling trees and flooding, this caused most of the flights into and out of the country to be canceled. At least four people were killed after being swept away by flood waters in the Dominican Republic.

In Haiti, Fay's winds and rainfall damaged the agricultural sector, including rice fields and banana crops. One person died after being swept away by flood-waters while trying to cross a swollen river. Two infants were killed when a bus flipped in Haiti. In total, ten deaths were blamed on Fay in Haiti.

In Jamaica, one person was killed as a result of a vehicle being swept away in flood waters. In total, 15 people died in the Caribbean.

Despite making landfall in central Cuba, exact impact from Fay in that nation is unknown.

United States

Florida

During seven days in Florida, August 18–24, 2008, eleven people died and thousands of homes plus roads were damaged, from 60 mph (97 km/h) winds and rain waters up to 5 feet (1.5 m) deep, with flooded rivers or tornadoes, as Fay traveled through the entire state. Making initial landfall in the Florida Keys and coming ashore again in the Naples area, Fay then crossed the state and exited near New Smyrna Beach, coming onshore again near St. Augustine and Jacksonville, crossing the Panhandle and finally leaving the Pensacola area into Alabama, early on August 24.  Returning from Mississippi towards Tennessee, Fay continued to dump heavy rains around Pensacola, Tallahassee, and Panama City even during August 25.

While Fay was moving across South-Central Florida, a tornado, rated EF2 on the Enhanced Fujita Scale, took place after landfall in Wellington, Florida, where significant damage was reported including doors and windows blown off houses, many trees knocked down and reports of a weak building destroyed. Another tornado damaged 51 homes with nine of them rendered uninhabitable in Barefoot Bay. According to the St. Lucie County Public Safety Department, about 8,000 homes were damaged from flooding. The city of Melbourne shattered a 50-year-old rainfall record after receiving  of rain in a 24‑hour period. About 80 neighborhoods in Melbourne were flooded, and a "couple hundred" homes in southeast Melbourne were filled with three to four feet of water, according to a press statement. One neighborhood was particularly hard hit: Lamplighter Village along John Rodes Boulevard in Melbourne, FL.  The flooding was so extensive that Governor Charlie Crist personally visited the neighborhood to assess the damage.  A tornado touched down in Stuart on U.S. 1 at Monroe Street, flipping a truck and damaging a gas station.  A 28-year-old kite surfer was critically injured in Fort Lauderdale when winds associated with a Tropical Storm Fay feeder band slammed him face-first into the ground and then dragged him across the streets until he hit a building, which was filmed by a WFOR camera crew.

Native wildlife, including alligators, were seen in flooded neighborhoods after high water forced them from their habitat. Early estimates from Brevard county show $10 to $12 million in damages to homes and infrastructure. Tropical Storm Fay resulted in the drowning of one person swimming off Neptune Beach and another swimmer in Duval County. Meanwhile, another 3 were killed in traffic accidents. On August 21, President George W. Bush declared the entire state of Florida a Federal Disaster Area.
Seminole County also got hard hit by floods. Seminole County Public Schools were closed due to many roads being impassable. Many rivers in the county such as the St. Johns River, the Econlockhatchee River, and the Little Econlockhatchee River jumped their banks. Riverside Park in Oviedo was under four feet of flood water due to the Little Econlockhatchee River. On the evening of August 22, a tornado damaged four homes and a bridge in Lake Wales.

After moving into the Florida Panhandle, five more people were killed as a result of Fay in Florida (all indirect), including an electrocution which happened to an electrical worker doing repairs in Gadsden County.

Georgia, Alabama, Mississippi
Heavy rain was also reported in parts of Alabama, Georgia and Mississippi. A young boy was killed in Grady County, Georgia when he was swept away in a drainage ditch by floodwaters. Another drowning death took place in Elmore County, Alabama as a result of the weakening Fay.  On August 22, 2008, radio station WNUZ, located in Alabama, "suffered direct lightning strikes" during Fay which resulted in "the complete destruction of the station's transmitter" and caused unspecified damage to other electrical broadcast equipment at the station.  The station applied to the Federal Communications Commission (FCC) for authority to stay silent while their engineers repaired or replaced the damaged gear and evaluated the station's other equipment. On December 24, 2008, WNUZ was granted permission to remain off the air until no later than June 22, 2009.

Fay persisted as a tropical storm from its first landfall until weakening to a tropical depression on August 23. It eventually weakened to a remnant low over Alabama on August 26, from which 8 tornadoes were spawned in Alabama and 6 in Georgia, injuring two in Commerce, Georgia.

High winds damaged the water tower in Midway, Alabama, compounding problems the town was experiencing with its water wells. A loan from the National Rural Water Association and assistance from Alabama Rural Water Association allowed Midway to make repairs and maintain the water supply. The heavy and persistent rains associated with Fay, however, helped to temporarily alleviate extreme drought conditions over northern Georgia, northern Alabama, and eastern Tennessee.

Elsewhere
Heavy rains in Tennessee triggered flash flooding throughout eastern portions of the state. In Shelby County, flooding covered several cars, trapping several people. In all, Fay caused $20,000 in damages in Tennessee. Rains in South Carolina caused a bridge in York County to collapse, leaving $100,000 in damages. Severe flooding in North Carolina, particularly in Mecklenburg County damaged numerous homes. Near Charlotte, 148 buildings sustained major damage from floodwaters and numerous roads were shut down due to high waters. Damage in Mecklenburg alone amounted to $8.5 million. In Cabarrus County, 14 swift water rescues were undertaken due to cars being stranded in flooded roads. About 70 homes were damaged in the county, leaving $1 million in damages. Damages to roads in the county were estimated at $5.5 million. In all, Fay caused roughly $15 million in damage in North Carolina.

Records
Fay was the first storm on record to hit the same U.S. state on four separate occasions, beating a record set by Hurricane Gordon of 1994, and was just the third storm on record to hit the U.S. at least 3 times, the third was Hurricane Juan in 1985, although Juan did not hit the same state three times; one of its landfalls was in Alabama, and the other 2 were in Louisiana. Fay was the first storm to prompt storm warnings for the entire coast of Florida; the four separate landfalls were responsible for every stretch of the Florida coast to receive a Tropical Storm Watch or Warning, or a Hurricane Watch or Warning.

See also

 Tropical cyclones in 2008
 List of Florida hurricanes (2000–present)
 Other storms of the same name
 Hurricane Charley (2004) – Took a similar path across the Caribbean and the Florida peninsula

References

External links

 NHC advisory archive for Tropical Storm Fay
 HPC rainfall page for 2008 Tropical Cyclones
 National Hurricane Center Website
 Fay radar animations (compiled by Brian McNoldy, RSMAS/Univ of Miami)

2008 Atlantic hurricane season
Atlantic tropical storms
Hurricanes in Haiti
Hurricanes in the Dominican Republic
Hurricanes in Florida
Hurricanes in Alabama
Tropical Storm Fay
Tropical Storm Fay
Tropical Storm Fay
Hurricanes in Georgia (U.S. state)
Hurricanes in Cuba
August 2008 events in North America
Fay